Guanylate kinase is an enzyme that in humans is encoded by the GUK1 gene.

References

Further reading

External links